Orlyonok (literally "eaglet" in Russian) may refer to:

Orlyonok, Russian federal state all-year camp for kids, formerly a Soviet Young Pioneer camp
A-90 Orlyonok, Russian ekranoplan
Orlyonok (game), a Soviet mass military game for children
 Orlyonok, a 1957 Soviet children's film made by the Odessa Film Studio
 Orlyonok/Ereliukas was a bicycle model for male teenagers manufactured in the Soviet Union in Belarus (MMBP) and Lithuania (Vairas)